Amen is a 2013 Indian Malayalam-language comedy-drama film directed by Lijo Jose Pellissery and written by P. S. Rafeeque from a story by Pellissery. The film revolves around the events that happen in a picturesque Kuttanadan village following the arrival of a young priest and a star-crossed lovers. The film stars Fahadh Faasil, Indrajith Sukumaran, Kalabhavan Mani, and Swathi Reddy (in her Malayalam debut). The film's songs and background score was composed by Prashant Pillai.

The film was released on 22 March 2013, receiving widespread positive reviews from critics. The film was also a commercial success at the box-office.

Plot
The plot revolves around the lives of a few people around an ancient Syrian church in a Kuttanadan village called Kumarankari. Solomon is in love with Shoshanna who is the daughter of a wealthy contractor. Solomon is a failed band member however he is the son of the famous Estapan ashan, who was renowned in Kerala for his clarinet playing abilities, and died in a boat accident.

Fr. Vincent Vattoli comes to the church as a new recruit to the parish. He learns about the relationship and tries to unite the couple. At this time, the marriage of Shoshanna gets fixed. Solomon attempts to elope, in vain. They are caught by Shoshana's parents and Solomon is mercilessly beaten up.

The people of Kumanamkari and the neighboring town then place a bet in which the St. George's band has to win in order for Solomon's marriage to occur. It was said that Shoshanna would be married to Solomon if they win the competition with Solomon leading the band.

The band takes intense practices and wins the bet, while Solomon's band master dies. At that night Shosana's father backs out of the bet. Him, the evil old parish priest and Solomons uncle are haunted at night by St. George at the time when they were destroying the church. They all came to the realisation that Solomon had divine powers on his side and they stood aside from Solomon's life as obstacles.

Solomon marries Shosana and the band continues to participate in other competitions. Later a call comes to the church informing that the new Priest Fr. Vincent Vattoli is taking charge. The Kumarangiri folks now come to know that Fr. Vincent Vattoli was actually the saint himself who appeared in front of them.

Cast

 Fahadh Faasil as Solomon
 Indrajith Sukumaran as Father Vincent Vattolli / St. George
 Kalabhavan Mani as Louis Pappan
 Swathi Reddy as Shoshanna
 Anil Murali as Davis
 Makarand Deshpande as Shevaliyar Pothachan
 Nandhu as Philipose
 Rachana Narayanankutty as Clara
 Joy Mathew as Father Abraham Ottaplakan
 Sunil Sukhada as Kappiyar Kochousep
 Chemban Vinod Jose as Paily
 Sandra Thomas as Mariyama
 Sasi Kalinga as Chachappan
 Rajesh Hebbar as Esthappan/Esthappanasan
 Sudheer Karamana as Mathachan
 Sudhi Koppa as Sebastian (Clara's lover)
 Chali Pala as Mathews
 Kulappulli Leela as Therutha
 Nisha Sarang as Leenamma /Mathachan's Wife
 Natasha Sahgal as Michelle
 Kainakary Thankaraj as Chali Pappan
 Jayasanker Karimuttam as Vishakol Pappy
 Shobha Singh as Solomon's Mother
 V K Unnikrishnan as Kamlasanan Engineer
 Rukmini Amma as Shoshanna's Grandmother
 Vinod Calicut as Vikraman
 Gokulan as Coconut Tree Climber

Production
The film is scripted by PS Rafeeque, who also wrote Lijo's debut feature film Nayakan (2010).

Indrajith was selected play the role of Father Vincent Vattolli, the young priest of a church in a village called Kumaramkari. This film is the actor's third film with Lijo after stellar performances in the critically acclaimed Nayakan and City of God (2011). Fahadh Faasil plays the other lead character named Solomon, who is in love with Shoshanna. Shoshanna is played by Andhra Pradesh-born actress Swathi Reddy, known for her role in the Tamil film Subramaniapuram. Meanwhile, scriptwriter-turned-actor Natasha Sahgal, plays the part of a French lady, come to study the music and local culture.

Soundtrack

Awards
 2013 - Kerala State Film Award for Best Costume Designer - Siji Thomas Nobel
 2013 - Kerala State Film Award for Best Art Director - M. Bawa
 2013 - TTK Prestige-Vanitha Film Awards - Most Popular film
 2013 : Kerala Film Critics Association Awards - Best Popular film
 2013 : 16th Asianet Film Awards 2014 - Best Music Director - Prashant Pillai

Release
Amen reached theatres on 22 March 2013, receiving positive reviews from critics. It was declared as a blockbuster.

Critical reception
Upon its release, Amen received widespread positive reviews from critics. Paresh C Palicha of Rediff.com stated that Amen is "brilliant" and concluded that "Director Lijo Jose Pellissery can be proud of making a brilliant film that has an intelligent story, a multi-layered screenplay, excellent cinematography and powerful performances from the actors." Aswin J Kumar of The Times of India gave the movie 3.5 stars in a scale of 5, stating that "In Amen, director Lijo Jose Pallisserry dabbles in a newly-found realm. He does the act joyfully with a tinge of absurdity and he derives laughter that sometimes wobbles on sheer madness. The good part is that the joy stays, warm and pleasant, all through the film."

Jo of Malayala Manorama gave the film a favourable review praising the cinematography of Abinandhan Ramanujam and direction. Mathrubhumi's entertainment website mb4frame also wrote a positive review saying 'Amen is visually and technically brilliant. Sify.com gave the movie a verdict of "brilliant" and concluded the review, saying that "When most films move out of your mind minutes after you leave the theaters, Amen just grabs you in a fantastic way. It has its flaws for sure, but just don't miss this gem. Two big thumbs up and a must watch recommendation for Amen!"

Smitha of Oneindia.in also gave the movie 3.5 stars and recommended to watch the movie "only if you enjoy watching different and experimental cinema." Veeyen of Nowrunning.com gave the movie 3 stars out of 5 and appreciated the movie, commenting that "The flavor, spirit and fun of Amen make it buoyantly unpretentious, and the sheer exuberance that it lets out renders it a movie of the magical kind. A feel-good, jovial and unfussy musical experience, it's a sunny gem of a film that drops down from the heavens above, as the Lord parts the clouds to take a look at the world down below."

Box office
Amen was commercial success at the Kerala box office. On 12 May, IBN Live reported that the film has made a clear profit of  30 million in 50 days. Amen completed 100 days in theatres across Kerala. Overall it had a gross of  8.12 crore with a satellite right of  2.90 crore and  2.7 million as other rights.

Remake
There were reports that it is to be remade in Bollywood with Ranbir Kapoor playing the lead role.

References

External links
 

2013 films
2010s Malayalam-language films
2010s musical films
Indian romantic musical films
Films about Christianity
Films about interclass romance
Films shot in Alappuzha
2010s romantic musical films
Films directed by Lijo Jose Pellissery